Shahab ad-Din Muhammad Hussain Mar'ashi Najafi (July 21, 1897 – August 29, 1990) was an Iraqi Shia Grand Ayatollah and Marja'.

Education 

He first mastered tajweed and learned the doctrines of tafsir which had been taught to him by his father, as well as Mirza Aboll Hassan Meshkini, Mohammad Hossein Shirazi, Hab Al-Din Shahrestani and Ibrahim Shafei Rafaei Baghdadi. 
Najafi was formally educated in the hawza of Najaf, and also spent three years studying in the Iraqi cities of Samarra and Kadhimiya; two important centres of Shia learning. He excelled in areas of fiqh, `ilm al-rijal, 'aql, and kalam.
Najafi received ijazahs from numerous scholars, among them Lady Amin.

Teaching 

Upon attaining the level of ijtihad in 1925, Najafi travelled to Qom, Iran, at the request of Abdul-Karim Ha'eri Yazdi, one of the most important revivalists of the Qom hawza. He stayed in the city of Qom until his death. He led the prayers in the shrine of Fatemah Masumeh for over half a century.
Among those that visited Najafi during his life in Qom include Rashid Ridha, Henry Corbin, and the Bengali poet Rabindranath Tagore.

Manuscript collection and library 

Whilst studying in Najaf, Najafi became growingly concerned with the immense wealth of Islamic knowledge that was being lost in the displacement and destruction of Shia texts. He took it upon himself to purchase as many rare books and manuscripts that he could on his modest clerical stipend in order to preserve them. When his stipend was exhausted, he took a job at a rice cleaning factory in Najaf, performed Qada prayers and fasts on behalf of others, and ate only one meal a day in order to raise enough money to purchase these books.

Najafi continued to collect these rare Shia manuscripts once he migrated to Iran. In 1965, he presented 278 rare manuscripts in Arabic and Persian to the University of Tehran College of Theology and Divinity. He would continue to donate many of these books to libraries across Iran.

In 1965, he was able to found the Marashiyah Islamic Seminary in Qom, where he allocated a number of rooms for the purpose of housing these books. It was not long before these rooms were formally designated as a library.

The large number of visitors to this library soon required that it be expanded. For this purpose,  of adjoining land was purchased in order to expand the existing library in 1970.

In 1974, the reference section of this library was inaugurated. 1,600 rare Shia manuscripts were added to this collection, which was followed by a further 500 manuscripts that were donated to the library's treasury.

At present both the old and the new buildings of the grand library occupies a total area of 21,000 sq. meters. Sayid Najafi laid the first stone of the foundation of the new library.

Death and will 

In his will, Najafi gave his son, Mahmoud Marashi Najafi, detailed advice on religious observances and study, good relations with close relatives, mercy to the poor and needy, and not wasting his time. He gave instructions regarding his own burial and grave, and enjoined his son if possible to use some of his wealth as Radd al-Madhaalim (money given to the poor as payment of possible unknown debts) on his father's behalf, in case he had any dues outstanding.

References 

1897 births
1990 deaths
People from Najaf
Iraqi ayatollahs
Iranian book and manuscript collectors